South Korean–Venezuelan relations are the bilateral relations between South Korea and Venezuela. South Korea has an embassy in Caracas and Venezuela has an embassy in Seoul.

History 
South Korea and Venezuela established diplomatic relations on 29 April 1965.

See also 
 Foreign relations of South Korea
 Foreign relations of Venezuela

References 

South Korea–Venezuela relations